The county of Yorkshire was one of the constituencies that went to a poll during the general election of 1807. This was the first time Yorkshire had seen a contested election since 1741.

The election is one of the most famous from the pre-reform era. It is most well known because of the amount of money spent, nearly £250,000 between the three candidates. This makes it the most costly election of any before 1832.

The three contestants were: William Wilberforce, leader of the anti-slavery movement in Parliament and MP for Yorkshire since 1784; Henry Lascelles, son of Lord Harewood and representative of Yorkshire between 1796 and 1806; and Lord Milton, son of Earl FitzWilliam. Counties each returned two MPs so two of these three would be successful.

Polling took place between 20 May and 5 June 1807. Wilberforce won with 11,808 votes whilst Milton gained the second seat with 11,177 votes. Lascelles came third with 10,990. This was only 187 fewer votes than Milton received.

Result

References

 E. A. Smith, 'The Yorkshire elections of 1806 and 1807: a study in electoral management', Northern History 2 (1967), pp. 62–90
 R. S. Furneaux, William Wilberforce 

Elections in Yorkshire
1807 United Kingdom general election